Jerrel Pete Jesse Britto (born July 4, 1992, in Port of Spain), known as Jerrel Britto, is a Trinidadian professional footballer who most recently played for Platense of Liga Nacional de Honduras and the Trinidad and Tobago national team.

Club career 
On 16 February 2017, Britto signed for Honduras Progreso. In his first season with the club he scored six times, including a goal in the Clausura semifinals against Olimpia.

International career 
On 29 April 2017, Britto made his senior debut for the Trinidad and Tobago national team, starting and playing 64 minutes in a 2–2 draw against Grenada.

References

External links
 
 

Living people
1992 births
Trinidad and Tobago footballers
W Connection F.C. players
Ma Pau Stars S.C. players
C.D. Honduras Progreso players
C.D. Malacateco players
C.D. Real Sociedad players
Platense F.C. players
Sportspeople from Port of Spain
TT Pro League players
Liga MX players
Liga Nacional de Fútbol Profesional de Honduras players
Association football forwards
Trinidad and Tobago international footballers